Faces in the Crowd is a long-running segment from Sports Illustrated. Starting in the January 9, 1956, issue, the segment was originally titled These Faces in the Crowd. The predecessor to These Faces... was a segment called Pat on the Back. It differed in that it did not just focus on unknown or amateur athletes. Contrary to Faces in the Crowd, it featured professional athletes who set milestones and celebrities who undertook an athletic endeavor. Slight deviations from its basic format are rare. One such example was in the college football preview issue on September 5, 1977 when the segment was temporarily retitled Freshmen in the Crowd and featured six incoming gridiron prospects from major NCAA Division I programs. From 1956 to 2006, a total of 15,672 athletes have been featured.

Video Faces in the Crowd
Video Faces in the Crowd is segment from Sports Illustrated and TAKKLE.com, which features up-and-coming high school athletes and their sports videos. The athletes are featured in the Sports Illustrated magazine, on the Sports Illustrated website and on the TAKKLE website.

Famous Faces in the Crowd

The 1950s

The 1960s

The 1970s

The 1980s

The 1990s

The 2000s

See also
 Sports Illustrated Almanac
 Sports Illustrated Kids
 Sports Illustrated on Campus
 Sports Illustrated Swimsuit Issue
 Sports Illustrated for Women

References

External links
 SI.com
 Sports Illustrated for Kids
 SI Mobile Swimsuit
 SI On Campus

Sports Illustrated